KBKB may refer to:

 KBKB (AM), a radio station (1360 AM) licensed to Fort Madison, Iowa, United States
 KBKB-FM, a radio station (101.7 FM) licensed to Fort Madison, Iowa, United States